Ctenophorus graafi, or Graaf's dragon is a species of agamid lizard occurring in the far eastern interior of Western Australia.

It was formerly considered to be a subspecies of Ctenophorus caudicinctus.

References

Agamid lizards of Australia
graafi
Endemic fauna of Australia
Reptiles described in 1967
Taxa named by Glen Milton Storr